A Front Page Story is a 1922 American silent comedy film directed by Jess Robbins and starring Edward Everett Horton, Lloyd Ingraham, and James Corrigan.

Cast
 Edward Everett Horton as Rodney Marvin 
 Lloyd Ingraham as Mayor Gorham 
 James Corrigan as Matt Hayward 
 Edith Roberts as Virginia Hayward 
 W.E. Lawrence as Don Coates 
 Buddy Messinger as Tommy 
 Mathilde Brundage as Mrs. Gorham 
 Lila Leslie as Suzanne Gorham 
 Tom McGuire as Jack Peeler

References

Bibliography
 Monaco, James. The Encyclopedia of Film. Perigee Books, 1991.

External links

1922 films
Silent American comedy films
Films directed by Jess Robbins
American silent feature films
1920s English-language films
American black-and-white films
Vitagraph Studios films
1922 comedy films
1920s American films